Anatoly Sysoyev (also transliterated Anatoli Sysoev, born 12 June 1937) is a Russian former diver. He competed in the men's 10 metre platform event for the Soviet Union at the 1960 Summer Olympics.

References

External links
 

1937 births
Living people
Russian male divers
Soviet male divers
Olympic divers of the Soviet Union
Divers at the 1960 Summer Olympics
Divers from Moscow